Bliss is an unincorporated community in Adair County, Kentucky, United States.  Its elevation is 696 feet (212 m).

A post office called Bliss was established in 1900, and remained in operation until 1958. One Mr. Bliss, an early postmaster, gave the community his last name.

References

Unincorporated communities in Adair County, Kentucky
Unincorporated communities in Kentucky